East Palace, West Palace (Simplified Chinese: 东宫西宫, Pinyin: Dōng gōng xī gōng) is a 1996 Chinese film directed by Zhang Yuan, starring Hu Jun and Si Han, and based on a short story by writer Wang Xiaobo. It is also known as Behind the Forbidden City or Behind the Palace Gates.

East Palace, West Palace is the first Mainland Chinese movie with an explicitly homosexual theme. The title of the movie is derived from the two parks near the Forbidden City — the East Palace and the West Palace. The two parks, specifically their public washrooms, are well-known for being places of congregation for homosexual in Beijing during the night.

Plot
In China, homosexuality isn't illegal, but homosexuals are routinely persecuted by police and arrested for "hooliganism". The film focuses on a young gay writer called A-Lan who, being attracted to a young policeman named Xiao Shi, manages to have himself arrested and interrogated for a whole night. His life-story which he tells during the interrogation reflects the general repression of the Chinese society. Xiao Shi's attitude shifts from the initial revulsion to fascination and, finally, to attraction.

Cast
Si Han as A-Lan
Hu Jun as Xiao Shi
Zhao Wei as Classmate in white shirt
Jing Ye as A-Lan as a youth
Liu Yuxiao as female thief
Ma Wen as Yamen runner
Wang Quan as A-Lan (young)
Lu Rong as A-Lan's mother
Zhao Xiaoyu as cop
Yang Jian as cop

Production
The film was shot in the spring of 1996, when it was smuggled out of China for post-production in France. The film was produced by Christophe Menager, Christophe Jung, and Zhang Yuan, executive produced by Willy Tsao, associate produced by Zhang Yukang, and edited by Vincent Levy, with sound by Wu Gang, Shen Jiaqin, and Bruno Lecoeur, music by Xiang Min, and art direction by An Bing; its director of photography was Jian Zhang. Its screenplay was written by Zhang Yuan and Wang Xiaobo. It was produced by Amazon Entertainment Limited and Quelqu'un d'Autre Productions and distributed by Fortissimo Films.

Release
East Palace, West Palace premiered at the Mar del Plata Film Festival in Argentina in November 1996 and at the 1997 Cannes Film Festival as part of the Un Certain Regard competition.

Reception
East Palace, West Palace received mostly positive reviews, holding a score of 80% on Rotten Tomatoes based on five critics. Lawrence Van Gelder of the New York Times described the film as "powerful drama and courageous politics," and Kevin Thomas of the Los Angeles Times praised Si and Hu's performances, calling the film "bold and daring" and reading it as a critique of authoritarian government. In Variety, Derek Elley provided a more negative review, describing the film as "beautifully shot" but also criticizing its portrayal of homosexuality as dated and describing A-Lan's repeated flashbacks as repetitive.

See also
Homosexuality in China
Men and Women (1999) by Liu Bingjian, a story of love resisted and love regained
Lan Yu (2001) by Stanley Kwan, a story set in modern Beijing with homosexual themes
Star Appeal (2004) by Cui Zi'en, a gay science-fiction film
My Fair Son (2005) by Cui Zi'en, a story of a teenage boy in love with an older man
Spring Fever (2009) by Lou Ye, a story of a love triangle between three young adults
Bad Romance (2011) by François Chang, a story of the affairs of several young couples in modern Beijing, based on the lyrics of the Lady Gaga song

References

External links

East Palace, West Palace at Strand Releasing

Chinese LGBT-related films
1996 drama films
Films set in Beijing
Films directed by Zhang Yuan
Gay-related films
Chinese drama films
1996 LGBT-related films